Graneledone yamana is a species of octopus in the genus Graneledone. G. yamana is assigned to this genus because of the absence of an ink sac and crop, the presence of cartilaginous warts covering the body cavity, uniserial suckers on the arms, and a reduced radula. This genus has been found in the deep waters of the Atlantic Ocean near hydrothermal vents. Its identifying characteristics are papillose skin, two horns located above the eyes, small gills, and five to seven lamellae located on the outside of the demibranch. The arms of G. yamana have 35–80 suckers on the females and 26–70 on the males. This species is known from the southwest Atlantic Ocean off the coasts of Uruguay, Argentina, and southern Brazil. G. yamana is the fifth species of Graneledone found in the southern oceans. G. yamana physically resembles the species Graneledone verrucosa, except the  cartilaginous warts on the body cavities of both these species differ. G. verruscosa is also found in the North Atlantic Ocean instead of the South.

References

 Kommritz J. G. 2000. A new species of Graneledone (Cephalopoda:Octopodidae) from the southwest Atlantic Ocean. J.Mollus.Stud.66(4):5 43-549. 
 Allcock A.L., Collins M.A., and Vecchione M. 2003. A redescription of Graneledone verrucosa (Verrill, 1881) (Octopoda:Octopodidae). J.Mollus. Stud. 69(2):135-143. 

Octopodidae
Molluscs described in 2000